(Latin for "It is not expedient") were the words with which the Holy See enjoined upon Italian Catholics the policy of boycott from the polls in parliamentary elections.

History
The phrase, "it is not expedient," has long been used by the Roman curia to indicate a negative reply for reasons of opportunity.

The papal policy was adopted after the promulgation of the Constitution of the Kingdom of Italy (1861), and the introduction of laws relating to the Catholic Church and, especially, to the religious orders (1865–66).  The Holy Penitentiary made a decree on 29 February 1868, in which it sanctioned the motto; " - Neither elector nor elected". Until then there had been in the young Italian Parliament a few eminent representatives of Catholic interests, e.g. Vito d'Ondes Reggio, Augusto Conti, Cesare Cantù.
 
Pius IX declared in an audience of 11 October 1874 that the principal motive of this decree was that the oath taken by deputies might be interpreted as an approval of the 'spoliation of the Holy See'.  Also, in view of the electoral law of that day, by which the electorate was reduced to 650,000, it would have been hopeless to attempt to prevent the passage of laws the Vatican did not approve of.

In parts of Italy (Parma, Modena, Tuscany, the former Pontifical States and the former Kingdom of the Two Sicilies), some Catholics were supporters of the dispossessed princes and they were liable to be denounced as enemies of Italy.  They would also have been at variance with the Catholics of Piedmont and of the provinces that were part of Habsburg Austria, and this division would have further weakened the Catholic Parliamentary group.

This measure did not meet with universal approval; moderates accused the Vatican of failing in its duty to society and to the newly unified country.
 
 
On the contrary, as many people came to the conclusion that the decree  was not intended to be absolute, but was only an admonition made to apply upon one particular occasion, the Holy Office declared (30 December 1886) that the rule in question implied a grave precept, and emphasis was given to this fact on several subsequent occasions (Letter of Leo XIII to the Cardinal Secretary of State, 14 May 1895; Congregation of Extraordinary Affairs, 27 January 1902; Pius X, Motu proprio, 18 December 1903).
 
(See Giacomo Margotti.)

The papal policy was cancelled in 1918.

In later years, particularly after the establishment of the Vatican City had reassured the papacy of its place within Italy, non-Catholic politicians would complain that the Holy See made too many recommendations to the Italian voters.

Sources

Latin political words and phrases
History of the papacy
Political history of Italy
1868 establishments in Italy
Holy See–Italy relations
20th-century disestablishments in Italy
Boycotts